Fiona Christianne Dourif (born October 30, 1981) is an American actress and producer. She is known for her role as Bart Curlish in BBC America's Dirk Gently's Holistic Detective Agency and as the young Diane Jones in Dustin Lance Black's When We Rise. She has appeared in Showtime's Shameless, and in a recurring role on NBC's The Blacklist, and starred as Nica Pierce in the 2013 horror film Curse of Chucky, its sequel Cult of Chucky, and the television series Chucky, all of which are part of the Child's Play franchise; she appears in these works alongside her father, Brad Dourif, who portrays the series' main antagonist, Chucky. In 2018, she was cast as Good Leader Tavis in the USA Network series The Purge.

Early life
Dourif was born in Woodstock, New York, the daughter of actor Brad Dourif and psychic Jonina (Joni) Dourif. She has a sister, Kristina Dourif. After college she became a segment producer for documentaries premiering on History and TLC. She began acting at 23.

Acting career
In 2005, Dourif made her acting debut as Chez Ami Whore in the television series Deadwood. The following year, she was cast as Alice in the television mini-series Thief. The same year, Dourif made her debut film appearance in Little Chenier.

In 2007, Dourif appeared in the off-Broadway play Some Americans Abroad at Second Stage theater. Later she was cast in the short film The Lucky One. In 2008, Dourif portrayed Becky in the indie film Garden Party and Lisa in Frank the Rat. The same year, Dourif guest starred on Law & Order: Special Victims Unit as Detective Nikki Breslin.

In 2009, Dourif starred in the film The Messenger and had a guest role on the television series Bored to Death. The following year, Dourif starred in the indie film Mafiosa and the TV movie After the Fall. Dourif subsequently portrayed Penny in Letters from the Big Man before having a recurring role as Casey in True Blood and a guest appearance on The Protector.

In 2012, Dourif starred in This is Caroline and The Master. The following year, Dourif portrayed Nica Pierce in Curse of Chucky, part of the Child's Play franchise in which her father, Brad Dourif, had long starred as Chucky. The film was a cult hit.

In 2014, she was cast in the indie films Gutshot Straight,  Dangerous Words from the Fearless, Precious Mettle, and Fear Clinic.

In 2016–17, Dourif played the "holistic assassin" Bart Curlish in Dirk Gently's Holistic Detective Agency. The series ran for two seasons. Also in 2016, she portrayed the young Rachel Griffiths in the ABC mini-series When We Rise. She played Brie in the indie thriller Blood is Blood.

In 2017, Dourif reprised her role as Nica Pierce in the horror film Cult of Chucky. She would reprise the role again in the Chucky television series, as well as playing the young version of Charles Lee Ray in flashbacks, the role her father played in the original 1988 film.

In 2018, Dourif played Jennifer Reddington, long lost daughter of main character Raymond Reddington, in Season 5 of the NBC drama The Blacklist. She also recurred in the 2018 series The Purge as Good Leader Tavis, a zealous cult leader.

In 2020, Dourif was cast as the villainous Rat Woman in the miniseries adaptation of Stephen King's novel The Stand.

Filmography

Film

Television

References

External links

 
 

1981 births
21st-century American actresses
Actresses from New York (state)
American film actresses
American people of French descent
American television actresses
Living people
People from Woodstock, New York